Crime Buster is a 1968 UK crime drama television series made by Associated Television. The series starred Mark Eden as Ray Saxon, a newspaper columnist with the Sunday Globe and a former champion cyclist, who investigates and exposes sports racketeers. Other regulars on the series included  Ray Mort as Jimmy Vine and Sonia Graham as Madge Raynor. The series only ran for one season with a total of 13 episodes which aired from August 8, 1968 through October 31, 1968. Occasionally the program would feature real athletes and other sports figures like broadcaster John Rickman in episodes.

References

External links
Crime Buster at IMDB

British crime drama television series
1968 British television series debuts
1968 British television series endings